Occultus  may refer to:
 Occult, knowledge of the hidden or the paranormal 
  (born 1971), Norwegian musician